Etobicoke North may refer to:

Etobicoke North GO Station, a station in the GO Transit network, Etobicoke district, Toronto, Ontario, Canada
Etobicoke North, a federal electoral district in Ontario, Canada
Etobicoke North (provincial electoral district), a provincial electoral district in Ontario, Canada